Opponens may refer to:
 Opponens digiti minimi muscle
 Opponens pollicis muscle